Senator Owen may refer to:

Brad Owen (born 1950), Washington State Senate
Frank Owen III (1926–1999), Texas State Senate
John J. Owen (1859–1933), Virginia State Senate
John Owen (North Carolina politician) (1787–1841), North Carolina State Senate
Robert L. Owen Sr. (1825–1873), Virginia State Senate
Robert Latham Owen (1856–1947), U.S. Senator from Oklahoma from 1907 to 1925
Walter C. Owen (1868–1934), Wisconsin State Senate
William E. Owen (1888–1976), Wisconsin State Senate

See also
Senator Owens (disambiguation)